Tevin Arona (born 5 September 1995) is a Cook Islands international rugby league footballer who plays as a  or  for the Auckland Vulcans.

Background
Arona was born in New Zealand. He is of Cook Islands descent.

He played his junior rugby league for the Richmond Bulldogs.

Playing career

Club career
Arona played in the NSW Cup for the New Zealand Warriors between 2017 and 2019.

He joined the Tweed Seagulls ahead of the 2021 Queensland Cup season.

Arona joined the Auckland Vulcans ahead of the 2022 season.

International career
Arona played for the Cook Islands at the 2019 Rugby League World Cup 9s. He made three appearances and scored a try at the competition.

In 2019 he made his international début for the Cook Islands against the United States of America.

In 2022 Arona was named in the Cook Islands squad for the 2021 Rugby League World Cup.

References

External links
Tweed Seagulls profile
Cook Islands profile

1997 births
Living people
Cook Islands national rugby league team players
New Zealand rugby league players
New Zealand sportspeople of Cook Island descent
Rugby league second-rows